Blackhall is a suburb in the north west of the Scottish capital city Edinburgh. It is a mainly residential area with amenities including a library and a small number of shops.

Geography 
Most of the housing in the neighbourhood was constructed in the inter-war period, although the recent housing boom has seen new development on the north east slope of Corstorphine Hill. This development went ahead despite considerable opposition from the local community and an unusual planning quirk which allowed the development to go ahead based on forty-year-old outline permission.
 

Blackhall has numerous community and church-based groups including a bowling club, two Probus Clubs, and a horticultural society. There is a local community council, Craigleith/Blackhall, that serves the area.

Etymology 
According to Stuart Harris in The Place Names Of Edinburgh the "Black-" in the placename could derive either from the Anglian blaec or Scots blac meaning simply black, and the "-hall" ending is from the Anglian halh or Scots haugh meaning land beside or in the bend of a river.

The local school, Blackhall Primary School, has recently been extended and parts rebuilt, as has the local Royal High School which serves Blackhall.

Nearby areas 
One of the main arterial routes of the city goes through the area, which borders Drylaw, Davidson's Mains, and Craigcrook.

Notable residents
John Horne lived at 12 Keith Crescent
Francis Jeffrey, Lord Jeffrey (1773–1850), judge and editor of the Edinburgh Review. There is a street named after him in Blackhall

References

External links
Bartholomew's Chronological map of Edinburgh (1919)
 Blackhall St. Columba's Church
 Craigleith and Blackhall Community Council
 Blackhall Primary School
 Royal High School

Areas of Edinburgh